Sphenolobus is a genus of liverworts belonging to the family Anastrophyllaceae.

The genus has cosmopolitan distribution.

Species:
 Sphenolobus achrous Spruce
 Sphenolobus acuminatus Horik.

References

Jungermanniales
Jungermanniales genera